Dudding may refer to:

Dudding (surname)
Dudding Hill Line, a railway line in north-west London, UK
Dudding Hill railway station on the  Dudding Hill Line